Ascidiella is a genus of tunicates belonging to the family Ascidiidae.

The genus has almost cosmopolitan distribution.

Species:

Ascidiella aspersa 
Ascidiella scabra 
Ascidiella senegalensis

References

Enterogona
Tunicate genera